KUG may refer to:
 Kiso Survey for Ultraviolet-excess Galaxies, an astronomical catalog
 Kubin Airport, Queensland, Australia
 Kug, a village in Sistan and Baluchestan Province, Iran
 University of Music and Performing Arts, Graz (Kunstuniversität Graz), Austria
 Gesetz betreffend das Urheberrecht an Werken der bildenden Künste und der Photographie or KunstUrhG, a German law protecting personality rights

See also
 KUGS, a college radio station in Bellingham, Washington